The Corrupt and Illegal Practices Prevention Act 1883 (46 & 47 Vict c. 51) was an Act of the Parliament of the United Kingdom of Great Britain and Ireland. It was a continuation of policy to make voters free from the intimidation of landowners and politicians. It criminalised attempts to bribe voters and standardised the amount that could be spent on election expenses.

Background 
Despite the Ballot Act 1872, William Ewart Gladstone's Second Ministry (1880–85) knew that to make voting less corrupt, certain measures were required to eradicate intimidation and bribery. The act meant that the expenses of candidates were published and could be measured against a limit as to how much could be spent on "political campaigns". It laid down rules for the conduct of parliamentary candidates, including a strict limit on expenses. The limit was set at £710 for the first 2,000 voters in the candidate's constituency, and then £40 for every additional 1,000 voters. Each candidate was limited to just one party agent (though in exceptional circumstances the candidate did have the right to petition parliament for more). Strict record keeping was required as proof that expenses were not being exceeded. Poorer men could also become parliamentary candidates and under the Act stiff penalties were imposed on those breaking it such as heavy fines and imprisonment.

Although it did not entirely remove corruption from the voting system, it strengthened the Corrupt Practices Act 1854 and was aided by a number of disenfranchised, small boroughs.

The Parliamentary Elections Corrupt Practices Act 1885 clarified that an employer was legally permitted to give paid time off from work to allow employees to vote, so long as this was given equally to all voters and not along party lines.

The Act, except section 42, was repealed by the Representation of the People Act 1949 (c.68), ss.175 & 176(2)&(3) & Sch.9; and the Election Commissioners Act 1949 (c.90), s.21 & Sch.

See also
 Corrupt practices
 Corrupt Practices Act 1695
 Corrupt Practices Act 1868
 List of UK parliamentary election petitions
 Reform Acts
 Representation of the People Act

Further reading

.

United Kingdom Acts of Parliament 1883
1883 in British law
Election legislation
Election law in the United Kingdom
Corruption in the United Kingdom